Md. Emdad-Ul-Bari OSP, ndc, psc is a retired major general of the Bangladesh Army. He served as Colonel Commandant of Signal Corps.

Education and training 
Major General Emdad-Ul-Bari holds Master of Defence Studies, Bachelor of Engineering (Telecom), and Bachelor of Science degrees. He is also a graduate of National Defence College, Mirpur; Collège Interarmées de Défense (L'École de Guerre), Paris; and Defence Services Command and Staff College, Mirpur. He underwent various military courses also in China, Pakistan, and UK.

Career
Bari was the chairperson of Dhaka Cantonment Girls' Public School & College in 2013.

Bari served as the director general for system and services at Bangladesh Telecommunication Regulatory Commission in 2017.

Bari was appointed vice chancellor of Bangladesh University of Professionals on 15 February 2018. He had served as an observer in MONUSCO. He was replaced by Major General Ataul Hakim Sarwar Hasan as vice chancellor of Bangladesh University of Professionals. Until retirement he was Director General of BIISS.

References

Living people
Bangladesh Army generals
Year of birth missing (living people)
Vice-Chancellors of Bangladesh University of Professionals